"Rock Me" is a single released by the American rock band Great White in 1987. It was a breakout hit for the band and still receives significant airplay on Classic Rock Radio. The original version clocked in at over 7 minutes, with the radio and video versions being trimmed down to between 3 and 5 minutes. Many of the lyrics to the edited versions are different from the original, though the music track remains the same.

Track listings

7" single (US)

7" single (UK)

12" single (UK)

Cassette single

CD single

Personnel 
 Jack Russell – lead vocals
 Mark Kendall – lead guitar, backing vocals
 Michael Lardie – rhythm guitar, harmonica, backing vocals
 Lorne Black – bass, backing vocals
 Audie Desbrow – drums

Charts 
Rock Me was on the Billboard Hot 100 chart for 14 weeks, peaking at number 60 on September 26, 1987.

References

External links 
"Rock Me" video clip

1987 singles
Great White songs
Capitol Records singles